Layzanshah or Shah of Layzan was a historical title given to the lords of Layzan. According to the researcher of the region's history, Vladimir Minorsky, the title was first granted to local rulers by their Sassanid Persian overlords. Later the title was acquired by Haytham ibn Khalid's brother Yazid ibn Khalid and passed on to his children. The latter's son attacked his cousin and killed all of his family, thus holding both titles of Layzanshah and Shirvanshah together.

Medieval Azerbaijan
Positions of authority
Sasanian administrative offices